Chaetotyphula is a genus of fungi in the Pterulaceae family. The genus is distributed largely in tropical areas, and contains seven species.

Species 

Source:

References

Pterulaceae
Agaricales genera